Krings is a German surname. Notable people with the surname include:

Armin Krings (born 1962), Luxembourgian footballer
Doresia Krings (born 1977), Austrian snowboarder and Olympics competitor
Ernest Krings (1920–2017), Belgian baron, judge, and legal scholar
Günter Krings (born 1969), German lawyer and politician
Heidi Krings (born 1983), Austrian snowboarder and Olympics competitor

See also
Kring (disambiguation), a similarly spelled surname, place name, etc.

German-language surnames